Pen-llwyn is a hamlet in the  community of Melindwr, Ceredigion, Wales, which is 72.5 miles (116.7 km) from Cardiff and 175.4 miles (282.3 km) from London. Penllwyn is represented in the Senedd by Elin Jones (Plaid Cymru) and is part of the Ceredigion constituency in the House of Commons.

Etymology
The name derives from the welsh language meaning "the head of the grove".

Notable people
 Lewis Edwards (1809–1887), educator and Nonconformist minister.
 Owen Prys (1857–1934), academic and theologian, born here

References

See also
List of localities in Wales by population 

Villages in Ceredigion